Rhode Island's 1st congressional district is a congressional district in the U.S. state of Rhode Island.  It includes all of Bristol and Newport counties, along with parts of Providence County, including most of the city of Providence.

The district is currently represented by Democrat David Cicilline, who has announced his intention to retire effective June 1st, 2023. In 2010, it was the least populous congressional district in the country.

History and composition 

Bristol County: Barrington, Bristol, and Warren.

Newport County: Jamestown, Little Compton, Middletown, Newport, Portsmouth, and Tiverton.

Providence County: Central Falls, Cumberland, East Providence, Lincoln, North Providence, North Smithfield, Pawtucket, Providence (part), Smithfield, and Woonsocket.

Voter registration

Recent results from statewide elections

List of members representing the district

Election history

2006

2008

2010

2012

2014

2016

2018

2020

2022

Historical district boundaries

See also

Rhode Island's congressional districts
List of United States congressional districts

References 
 

 Congressional Biographical Directory of the United States 1774–present

01
Bristol County, Rhode Island
Newport County, Rhode Island
Providence County, Rhode Island
Constituencies established in 1843
1843 establishments in Rhode Island